The Venerable William Hutchins (18 March 1792 – 4 June 1841) was an English churchman and academic, a Fellow of Pembroke College, Cambridge.
Hutchins was born in Ansley, Warwickshire, England, second son of vicar of Ansley, Rev. Joseph Hutchins.

Hutchins was educated at Atherstone Grammar School and Pembroke College, Cambridge. After curacies at Wirksworth and Ireton he was elected a Fellow of Pembroke.

Hutchins became the first and only Anglican Archdeacon of Van Diemen's Land, a position offered him in 1836 by William Grant Broughton, bishop of Australia.

Hutchins was a strong supporter of education through the Church, and because of this The Hutchins School, established in 1846 in Hobart, was named in his honour. The school continues to operate as at 2020.

References

1792 births
1841 deaths
Anglican archdeacons in Australia
Fellows of Pembroke College, Cambridge
People from Warwickshire
English emigrants to Australia
People educated at Atherstone Grammar School, Warwickshire
19th-century English Anglican priests
19th-century Australian Anglican priests